Lightstep may refer to:

 LiteStep, a Windows shell replacement
 The Lightstep, a 2008 novel by English author John Dickinson